Chasing Shadows may refer to:

Books, film, TV, and games
 Chasing Shadows (TV series), a British television series
 Chasing Shadows, the name of several photography collections by Santu Mofokeng
 "Chasing Shadows", a story by Lucrecia Guerrero
 Chasing Shadows, a 1996 book by Fred A. Wilcox
 Chasing Shadows, the autobiography of Hugo Gryn (also made into a film)
 "Chasing Shadows", a chapter of the game GemCraft
 Chasing Shadows: A Special Agent's Lifelong Hunt to Bring a Cold War Assassin to Justice
 Sekret Machines: Book 1 – Chasing Shadows, a 2016 American novel by Tom DeLonge and A. J. Hartley

Music

Albums 
 Chasing Shadows (The Comsat Angels album), 1986
 Chasing Shadows, a 1957 album by Jackie Davis
Chasing Shadows, a 1997 album by Davy Steele
 Chasing Shadows, a 2000 album by John Etheridge
 Chasing Shadows, a 2007 album by the German band Empire featuring the frontman Doogie White and bass player Neil Murray
 Chasing Shadows, a 2012 album by The Strange Familiar
 Chasing Shadows (EP), a 2016 EP by Angels & Airwaves
 Chasing Shadows (Black Tide album)
 Chasing Shadows (Smokie album), 1992

Songs 
 "Chasing Shadows", a song by Anoushka Shankar from the 2011 album Traces of You
 "Chasing Shadows", a song by Chaos Divine album from the 2011 album The Human Connection
 "Chasing Shadows", a song by Deep Purple  from the 1969 album Deep Purple
 "Chasing Shadows", a song by Frankmusic from the 2013 album Between
 "Chasing Shadows", a 2013 song by Jamie Drastik featuring Pitbull and Havana Brown
 "Chasing Shadows", a 1935 song by Jimmy Dorsey and Tommy Dorsey; covered by many artists
 "Chasing Shadows", a song by Kansas from the 1992 album Vinyl Confessions
 "Chasing Shadows", a song by Paul Field from the 1983 album Daybreak
 "Chasing Shadows", a song by Paul Rodgers from the 1997 album Now
 "Chasing Shadows", a song by Santigold from the 2016 album 99¢
 "Chasing Shadows", a song by Shakira from the 2014 album Shakira
 "Chasing Shadows", a song by Yanni from the 1997 album In the Mirror